Ashish Khetan is an Indian lawyer and journalist.

Political life 
In 2014, he joined the Aam Aadmi Party and fought the 2014 Indian General Election from New Delhi but lost to Bharatiya Janata Party's candidate Meenakshi Lekhi.

In 2015, he was appointed as vice chairman of the Dialogue and Development Commission (DDC) of Delhi, a think tank of the Delhi government. He was given the rank of Cabinet Minister for his contributions to the government.

In April 2018, he resigned from the DDC to practice law. In August 2018, he left the Aam Aadmi Party, citing the desire to pursue law as a full-time profession.

Khetan was pulled into controversy when he hurt the religious sentiments of Sikhs by referring to the manifesto of the Aam Aadmi Party as the Guru Granth Sahib, which he later apologised for.

References

Aam Aadmi Party candidates in the 2014 Indian general election
Aam Aadmi Party politicians
21st-century Indian politicians
Delhi politicians
Living people
1976 births